Montgallet is a station on Line 8 of the Paris Métro, named after Rue Montgallet, which it serves. The station opened on 5 May 1931 with the extension of the line from Richelieu–Drouot to Porte de Charenton.

Rue Montgallet is well known in Paris for its computer shops.

Gallery

Station layout

Paris Métro stations in the 12th arrondissement of Paris
Railway stations in France opened in 1931